Constituency NA-79 (Faisalabad-V) was a constituency for the National Assembly of Pakistan from 2002-2018. Representing mainly the Samundri Tehsil, it has been merged into the new NA-104.

Election 2002 

General elections were held on 10 Oct 2002. Muhammad Safdar Shaker of PML-Q won by 61,150 votes.

Election 2008 

General elections were held on 18 Feb 2008. Rana Muhammad Farooq Saeed an Independent candidate won by 58,563 votes.

Election 2013 

General elections were held on 11 May 2013. Chaudhary Muhammad Shehbaz Babar of PML-N won by 118,516 votes and became the  member of National Assembly.

References

External links
 Election result's official website

NA-079